Ian Boddy is a British electronic musician and composer. In the early 1980s Boddy began experimenting at an Arts Council-funded studio in Newcastle. This period resulted in 3 cassette releases on the Mirage label, which showcased Boddy's work with analogue synthesis and tape manipulation. "Images" (1980), "Elements of Chance" (1981) and "Jade". In 1983 Boddy's first LP, The Climb, was released, followed by two more LPs, Spirits (1984) and Phoenix (1986). In 1989 Boddy released his first CD, Odyssey, on the Surreal To Real label, followed by Drive (1991). Following these releases, Boddy founded the Something Else Records label, releasing another 4 albums, "The Uncertainty Principle" (1993), "The Deep" (1994), "Continuum" (1996), "Rare Elements" (1997) and reissuing his first 3 LPs and one of his early cassettes, "Jade"(1992). On Something Else Records he also released 3 collaborations, "Symbiont" (1995) with Andy Pickford, "Phase 3" (1997) with Ron Boots and "Octane" (1998) with Mark Shreeve under the name of ARC. A cassette-only release of live recordings between 1980 and 1989 was also available for a short period. In 1999 he founded the DiN Records label.

More recent recordings have included:
"Box of Secrets" DiN1 (1999)
"Distant Rituals" DiN2 (1999) with Markus Reuter
"Autonomic" DiN4 (1999) with Nigel Mullaney as Dub Atomica
"Caged" DiN5 (2000) with Chris Carter
"Radio Sputnik" DiN7 (2000) with Mark Shreeve as ARC
"Shrouded" Space For Music Records (2000) Live recording for Philadelphia
"Triptych" DiN9 (2001) with Markus Reuter and Nigel Mullaney
"Outpost" DiN11 (2002) with Robert Rich
"Aurora" DiN12 (2002)
"Blaze" DiN15 (2003) with Mark Shreeve as ARC
"Chiasmata" DiN16 (2004)
"Pure" DiN17 (2004) with Markus Reuter
"Moire" DiN18 (2005) with Bernhard Wostheinrich
"Arcturus" DiN19 (2005) with Mark Shreeve as ARC
"Jodrell Bank Concert" Space For Music Records (2002) with Markus Reuter. Live recording from 1999.
"Lithosphere" DiN21 (2005) with Robert Rich
"Elemental" DiN25 (2006)
"Fracture" Din26 (2007) with Mark Shreeve as ARC
"React" DiN29 (2008) with Robert Rich
"Slide" DiN31 (2008)
"Dervish" DiN33 (2009) with Markus Reuter
"Shifting Sands" AD072 (2009) with David Wright
Frontiers DIN39 (2012) with Erik Wøllo

References

External links
Official Ian Boddy website
Profile at Starsend website
Profile at Planet Origo
DiN Records website
 
 

Year of birth missing (living people)
Living people
British electronic musicians
British composers
Third Mind Records artists
Cassette culture 1970s–1990s